Ordfront (lit. Word Front) is a left-oriented Swedish publishing house, established in 1969. Except for the publishing of the magazine Ordfront, the association also organize courses and seminars. In 2006, the organisation had about 15,000 members and 20 local associations.

Works
 Palimpsest (2016)

Further reading
Burke, Al. "All Quieted on the Word Front: Notes on the abuse of power and the stifling of dissent by Swedish 'progressives'", 2005.

References

External links
 Ordfront Website

Book publishing companies of Sweden
Publishing companies established in 1969
1969 establishments in Sweden